Tenerife South Airport , also known as Tenerife South–Reina Sofía Airport, is the larger of the two international airports located on the island of Tenerife (the other being Tenerife North Airport) and the second busiest in the Canary Islands (after Gran Canaria Airport). It is located in the municipality of Granadilla de Abona and handled over 11 million passengers in 2018. Combined with Tenerife North Airport, the island gathers the highest passenger movement of all the Canary Islands, with 12,248,673 passengers, surpassing Gran Canaria Airport.

History
In the late 1960s, the island authorities of Tenerife found the need for a new airport at a new location, because the existing airport did not meet technical requirements due to adverse weather conditions, especially low visibility in foggy conditions; this was exemplified by the event of what became the deadliest aviation accident in history, when on 27 March 1977, two Boeing 747's collided on the runway at Los Rodeos, killing 583 people.

Only 20 months later, with the disaster still fresh in people's minds, the new airport was inaugurated on 6 November 1978, by Queen Sofía of Spain, to whom the airport is dedicated. The first flight was Iberia flight IB187 from Lanzarote, which was operated by a McDonnell Douglas DC-9 landing at 10:17. The airport was constructed close to the Tomás Zerolo airfield, which closed when TFS opened. By the end of its first year, 1 million passengers had passed through its doors.

In June 1980, Viasa inaugurated flights to Caracas. The link served the large proportion of the Canarian diaspora that resided in Venezuela. The airline ceased operations in 1997, after which Avensa started plying the route. Due to financial problems, Avensa later let Santa Bárbara Airlines take over its flights to Spain in exchange for a codeshare agreement. Santa Bárbara commenced service to Reina Sofía Airport in October 2002 using McDonnell Douglas DC-10 equipment, although it switched to Tenerife North Airport four months later.

United Airlines launched a direct connection to Newark in June 2022. Boeing 757s operate the flight on a seasonal basis.

Terminal
Tenerife South consists of one three-storey passenger terminal in a classic brick style. The main level, Floor 0, contains all check-in and service counters, the departures waiting areas as well as the arrivals and main baggage reclaim. The departures area features 40 boarding gates of which eight are equipped with jetbridges. While the upper floor 1 contains office space and transit corridors, the basement level -1 features additional luggage belts.

Airlines and destinations

The following airlines operate regular scheduled and charter flights at Tenerife South Airport:

Statistics

Passengers

Routes

Ground transport
The public bus service TITSA offers services to all parts of the island. Line 343 connects the South Airport (TFS) with Tenerife North Airport (TFN). The planned Tren del Sur will serve the airport if it is built.

References

External links

 Official website

Airports in the Canary Islands
Airports established in 1978
Buildings and structures in Tenerife
Transport in Tenerife